Johan Gabriel Hirvensalo (6 January 1880, Iisalmi - 18 October 1941; surname until 1903 Lagus) was a Finnish farmer, civil servant and politician. He was a member of the Parliament of Finland, representing the Young Finnish Party from 1913 to 1917 and the National Progressive Party from 1922 to 1924.

References

1880 births
1941 deaths
People from Iisalmi
People from Kuopio Province (Grand Duchy of Finland)
Young Finnish Party politicians
National Progressive Party (Finland) politicians
Members of the Parliament of Finland (1913–16)
Members of the Parliament of Finland (1916–17)
Members of the Parliament of Finland (1922–24)
University of Helsinki alumni